Bakhtiyarovka is a rural locality (selo) and the administrative center of Bakhtiyarovskoye Rural Settlement, Leninsky District, Volgograd Oblast, Russia. The population was 822 as of 2010. There are 12 streets.

Geography 
Bakhtiyarovka is located on the left bank of the Akhtuba River, 8 km northwest of Leninsk (the district's administrative centre) by road. Leninsk is the nearest rural locality.

References 

Rural localities in Leninsky District, Volgograd Oblast